
Zduńska Wola County is a unit of territorial administration and local government (powiat) in Łódź Voivodeship, central Poland. It came into being on January 1, 1999, as a result of the Polish local government reforms passed in 1998.

As of 2006 its total population is 67,704, out of which the population of Zduńska Wola is 44,370, that of Szadek is 2,007, and the rural population is 21,327.

Neighbouring counties
Zduńska Wola County is bordered by Poddębice County to the north, Łask County to the east and Sieradz County to the west.

Administrative division
The county is subdivided into four gminas (one urban, one urban-rural and two rural). These are listed in the following table, in descending order of population.

References
Polish official population figures 2006

 
Land counties of Łódź Voivodeship